Herschel Goldberg (November 2, 1901 – October 1, 1980), better known as Harry Grey, was a Russian Jewish-American writer. His first book, The Hoods (1952), was the model for the 1984 film Once Upon a Time in America by Sergio Leone, where his part was played by Robert De Niro. The book was one of the few autobiographies of real gangsters. It is believed that the real name of the author was Goldberg and that his memoir, partially factual, partially subconsciously altered, and partially fictional, was written when Goldberg was incarcerated in the Sing-Sing prison.

After The Hoods, Grey published two more books, Call Me Duke (1955) and Portrait of a Mobster (1958), also based on his experience as a gangster, but these had much less success. A "Golden Palm Star", part of the Palm Springs Walk of Stars, was dedicated to Grey in 1999.

Biography
Grey's real name was Herschel Goldberg. Born in Kiev (then part of the Russian Empire) in 1901, son of Israel and Celia Goldberg, emigrated to the United States in 1905 and dropped out of school in the seventh grade. He was the brother of Hyman Goldberg, a syndicated columnist and food critic for the New York Post and author of several books including "Our Man in the Kitchen", a compilation of recipes from his column as Prudence Penny.

In 1912, Goldberg's father became seriously ill and had to be taken to hospital for an operation. During his stay in hospital, Celia began cooking meals for men in the neighborhood who were saving money to bring their families to America from Europe. When Israel came out of hospital he found that Celia had a flourishing business and Israel started a restaurant. All the children, including Harry and Hyman, helped out.

In 1932, Grey married Mildred Becker, a college graduate and had three children, Beverle, Harvey, and Simeon. After being hospitalized by an accident in his fifties, Harry decided to write about life in the twenties and thirties and the syndicates that controlled businesses in New York. To protect himself and his family he changed the family name to Grey.

Grey died in October 1980, shortly before filming of Once Upon a Time in America began.

In December 1999, Harry's son Simeon sponsored a star on the Palm Springs Walk of Stars for his father under the name of Harry "Noodles" Grey. Biographical details are attached to this star.

Bibliography
 The Hoods
 Call Me Duke
 Portrait of a Mobster

See also
 David "Noodles" Aaronson – a character in The Hoods.

References
1910 NY Census
1915 NY Census
1920 NY Census
1925 NY Census
1930 NY Census
1940 NY Census part a
1940 NY Census part b
Death index
Obituary

External links

1901 births
1980 deaths
20th-century American novelists
American male novelists
American crime fiction writers
Organized crime memoirists
20th-century American male writers
Emigrants from the Russian Empire to the United States
20th-century pseudonymous writers